William Shelton is a university administrator, having served as President of Eastern Michigan University for 11 years and interim Chancellor at East Carolina University.  Born in Tennessee and earned a bachelor's and master's degrees in history from the University of Memphis. He was conferred a doctorate degree in higher education administration from the University of Mississippi. He has been a sportscaster, and on the NCAA Presidents Commission, and chaired the NCAA Committee on Sportsmanship and Ethical Conduct in Intercollegiate Athletics. In 1995 he was the president of the Mid-American Conference. Before coming to ECU in 2000, he was the president of Eastern Michigan University for 11 years.

External links 
 Shelton biography

Presidents of East Carolina University
Presidents of Eastern Michigan University
Living people
Year of birth missing (living people)